Menai is a suburb in southern Sydney, in the state of New South Wales, Australia 29 kilometres south of the Sydney central business district in the local government area of the Sutherland Shire.

History
Menai is named after Menai Bridge, a town on the Menai Strait in Wales.

The area now known as Menai was originally called Bangor in 1895 by the land's owner, a farmer named Owen Jones, after his birthplace Bangor in Wales. To avoid confusion with Bangor in Tasmania, the Postmaster General's Office changed the suburb name to Menai in 1910. Menai Bridge in Wales lies opposite Bangor on the Menai Strait. When Menai expanded, the eastern section became Bangor again.

The suburb has been affected by bushfires on several occasions, including the 1994 Eastern seaboard fires and 2017–18 Australian bushfire season.

Population
According to the 2016 census of Population, there were 10,304 people in Menai.
 Aboriginal and Torres Strait Islander people made up 1.5% of the population. 
 77.4% of people were born in Australia. The next most common countries of birth were England 2.6%, China 1.3%, South Africa 1.2% and New Zealand 1.1%.
 80.3% of people spoke only English at home. Other languages spoken at home included Greek 2.1%, Arabic 1.8%, Mandarin 1.5%, Bulgarian 1.5% and Cantonese 1.2%.
 The most common responses for religion were Catholic 32.1%, Anglican 19.1%, No Religion 19.0% and Eastern Orthodox 6.1%.

Commercial area

Menai contains three bustling shopping centre around Menai Road with many retail stores and fine restaurants: Menai Marketplace, Menai Metro and Menai Central.

 Menai Marketplace is located beside the Menai Community Buildings and features a Woolworths supermarket, Big W discount department store and many specialty shops including a Bakers Delight and formally Michel's Patisserie. Menai Library is located near the Menai Marketplace.
 
 Menai Metro consists of professional suites and restaurants and is located in Allison Crescent, Menai. Menai Metro comprises the dining out, restaurant, precinct in the area.
 
 Menai Central is located in Carter Rd, Menai and comprises larger bulky goods stores including supermarkets, liquor, pets, and homewares.

Transport
Transdev NSW operates four bus routes.
961 Sutherland to Barden Ridge
962 Miranda to 
963 to Padstow
M92 Sutherland to Parramatta

Many people use drive-park-ride mode of transport to work. There are three well serviced train stations with parking facilities within 8–15 minutes driving (Padstow: 8.5 km, Jannali: 7.4 km, Sutherland: 7.2 km).

Housing
Menai is a newer suburb, having been developed only since the early 1980s, and as such, nearly all the homes are new 4-bedders with dual bathrooms and double-garages and mostly owner occupied. In fact, the region has one of the highest rates of home ownership in Australia, at over 81%.

Sport and recreation
Menai Hawks Football club is the largest sporting club in the area with 1,300 members playing soccer every week based at Buckle Reserve Menai.
An indoor sporting complex is adjacent to the Menai Marketplace shopping centre. Menai is home to the Menai Junior Rugby League Football Club. Menai is also home to the Menai Dragons basketball association.

The local council operates the Menai Indoor Sports Centre.

A small commercial swimming pool Menai Swim Academy operates from Old Illawarra Road at Menai.

Schools
Menai's schools include Menai Primary [K-6], Aquinas College [Catholic, 7-12] and Holy Family Primary School [Catholic, K-6]. Menai High School [7-12] is not in Menai, but just outside in Illawong.

Churches
Holy Family Catholic Church, which services the 2234 postcode area, has an affiliated Catholic infants, primary and high school.
There are also several other "Menai" Churches serving the 2234 area, within Menai and in surrounding suburbs. They include Menai Anglican Church (St Paul's Anglican Church, Broughton Place, Barden Ridge), Menai Baptist Church (at Inaburra School, 77 Billa Rd, Bangor), Menai Salvation Army Church (11 Pilliga Pl, Bangor), Urban Life Church (Unit 8/800-812 Old Ilawarra Rd, Menai), Hope Community Church (545 Old Illawarra Rd, Menai), Christian Reformed Church (Cnr Allies Rd and Elliston Place, Barden Ridge), and Menai Illawong Uniting Church (281-289 Fowler Rd, Illawong).
There was once also a Menai Congregational Church Opposite the original (wooden) Menai Public School

Emergency services
The Metropolitan Fire Brigade is located on Menai Road, near the intersection of Old Illawarra Road.

The State Emergency Service (SES) is located near the Metropolitan Fire Brigade, taking over from the previous occupant, the Rural Fire Service (RFS) who now operate from a new station built in Barden Ridge in 2015.

The Ambulance Station is across the road from the metropolitan fire brigade and SES.

References

Suburbs of Sydney
Sutherland Shire